Luca Sterbini (born 12 November 1992) is an Italian former professional racing cyclist, who rode professionally for the  team in 2015 and 2016.

Major results

2010
 1st  Time trial, National Junior Road Championships
2013
 3rd Time trial, National Under-23 Road Championships
2014
 8th Overall Giro della Regione Friuli

References

External links
 

1992 births
Living people
People from Palestrina
Italian male cyclists
Cyclists from Lazio
Sportspeople from the Metropolitan City of Rome Capital